Elizabeth Sutherland may refer to:
Elizabeth Leveson-Gower, Duchess of Sutherland, née Elizabeth Sutherland, (1765–1839), British peeress
Elizabeth Sutherland, 24th Countess of Sutherland (1921–2019), British peeress